The Citroën C3 Aircross is a name designated to two SUVs produced under the Citroën marque, from the French automaker PSA Group, and later Stellantis. The first is the Brazilian version of C3 Picasso MPV, and the second is an urban SUV launched in 2017 that replaces the C3 Picasso in Europe.


C3 Picasso-based model (AI58 ; 2010)

The Citroën C3 Aircross for Latin America is a mini SUV close with the global Citroën C3 Picasso. It was first announced by Citroën's Brazilian division in August 2010. The C3 Aircross is manufactured in Porto Real, Brazil, and was launched in the country in September 2010. It was exported to selected markets such as Argentina, Uruguay, Paraguay, Colombia and Costa Rica.

Compared with the global C3 Picasso, the restyled C3 Aircross has raised suspension, chrome roof bars, mirror covers, side skirts and a rear spare tyre. The C3 Aircross is based on the Brazilian first generation Citroën C3, when the global C3 Picasso is based on the global Peugeot 207 SW. The C3 Aircross is capable of running on E85 Bioethanol.

Ivan Segal, the managing director of Citroën of Brazil predicted sales of 30,000 Aircross models in a full year at launch, but lowered this expectation in 2011 to 2,000 Aircross models per month. Segal wanted to achieve this by targeting "young and adventurous" buyers.

In May 2011, a non-crossover model model derived from the C3 Aircross was launched. Although called C3 Picasso, it was closer to the C3 Aircross (same platform, same grill, same interior, no tailgate) than to the global C3 Picasso.

Late 2014, Citroën C3 Aircross Lunar showcar was revealed at São Paulo International Motor Show.

Design and features
The Aircross features an upholstered fabric interior, with corduroy or leather options. The engine supports are designed to collapse downwards slightly in a front end impact to prevent the engine from invading the cabin and injuring passengers. The C3 Aircross SX and Exclusive models have ABS, one of the few vehicles on sale in the Brazilian market with this feature.

The C3 Aircross was designed with an obligation for green materials to be used where viable.  of the vehicle's polymers, include the parcel shelf, boot carpet, and partial use in the doors, are from natural fibres to meet this target.

Engines
In Brazil, the Aircross is available with a four speed automatic or five speed manual gearbox.

Restyling (AI58R ; 2016) 
In the end of 2015, a facelifted version of the C3 Aircross was introduced in South America as a model for 2016. The most significant changes are a new front end. The non-Aircross version (C3 Picasso) was dropped.

The name of the C3 Aircross was changed to Citroën Aircross.

In 2016, Citroën revealed a showcar based on the Aircross, called Aircross Beach Crosser.

The production of the Aircross ended late 2020.

Reviews
Autoblog.com reviewed the C3 Aircross, giving a mostly negative review to aspects and features of the vehicle. The basic X model launched with no airbags, ABS, or temperature sensor; the last of which they consider to be a necessity in the hot Latin American climate. They criticised the boot, calling it awkward and complicated since it can only open once an arm carrying the spare tyre has been unlocked and swung out of the way, which increases the space required for parking.

Further, in their review, they complained that the dashboard mounted displays were difficult for the driver to see comfortably, echoing concerns CNET had when reviewing the C3 Picasso, where they called the displays "not particularly readable" and possibly dangerous to use while driving.

Only one engine is available for the C3 Aircross; a 1.6-litre HDi used in other Citroën cars, including the Latin American market's C3 Picasso. Autoblog.coms review was favourable to it since it performed very well in the Aircross off-road, although it was noisy on road. They found no discernible issues with the suspension, which handled well on and off the road, traversing irregular terrain without issues.

Standalone model (A88 ; 2017)
The Citroën C3 Aircross for Europe is a subcompact crossover SUV from Citroën. Presented on 12 June 2017 in Paris, it has been marketed from October of the same year. The C3 Aircross was announced by the C-Aircross concept car, presented at the 2017 Geneva Motor Show.

It shares its platform and many elements with its cousin the Opel Crossland X that replaces the Meriva, following the partnership between Groupe PSA and General Motors, which was first announced in 2012. Its style, directed by Pierre Authier, is in harmony with that of the new Citroën range: front double decker, "3D" lights. The C3 Aircross also offers numerous possibilities for customisation.

 Citroën C4 Aircross 

In China, a long wheel base version is launched in 2018. It is known as the C4 Aircross (full name: Dongfeng Citroën Yunyi C4 Aircross'). Its wheelbase at 2,655 mm is 11.5 centimetres longer which results into a length of 4,270 mm. The Citroën C4 Aircross was prematurely discontinued in 2020 due to poor sales.

Facelift 

The model underwent a mid-life restyling through a facelift (inspired by CXperience concept), revealed in February 2021.

Sales

Brazilian C3 Picasso-based model

Global standalone Model 

Like its predecessor, the C3 Picasso, the C3 Aircross is mostly popular in France and Italy, which together absorb almost half of total production. The vehicle's main export market outside Europe is Turkey.

Notes

References

External links

Front-wheel-drive vehicles
C3
2010s cars
2020s cars
Cars of Brazil
Mini sport utility vehicles
Crossover sport utility vehicles